Juan José Halty Sarobe (born 7 June 1989) is a Chilean former professional footballer who played as a goalkeeper.

Career
Halty was born in Santiago, Chile. was a reserve goalkepper for Club Universidad de Chile as the club won the 2009 Torneo Apertura. He never appeared in a league match for the club and finished his playing career with lower league sides.

After he retired from playing, Halty became a goalkeeper coach. He initially worked with U. de Chile's youth teams, and after a chance encounter with the club's staff at a tournament in Ecuador, Halty joined C.S.D. Independiente del Valle as the senior side's goalkeeper coach.

Halty bears a resemblance to Chilean international goalkeeper Claudio Bravo and has appeared in Chilean television commercials as his double.

Honours
Universidad de Chile
 Torneo Apertura: 2009

References

External links
 
 

1989 births
Living people
Chilean footballers
Audax Italiano footballers
Universidad de Chile footballers
Curicó Unido footballers
Provincial Talagante footballers
Chilean Primera División players
Primera B de Chile players
Association football goalkeepers